Polonia was a passenger steamship that was built in Scotland in 1910, originally named Kursk and was registered in the Russian Empire. She was an Allied troopship in the First World War, when she was briefly operated by Cunard Line. After the war she returned to civilian passenger service, in Latvian service until 1930 and then for Poland.

Building
The Danish East Asiatic Company ordered the ship from Barclay, Curle & Co Ltd of Glasgow. She was built as yard number 482, launched on 7 July 1910 and completed that September. She was launched as Kursk, named after the city of Kursk in western Russia.

The ship had twin four-cylinder quadruple-expansion engines driving twin screws. Between them, the engines developed 1,020 NHP.

Service
The East Asiatic Company registered Kursk in Liepāja in the Russian Empire. After the October Revolution, the UK Shipping Controller chartered her and placed her under Cunard Line management. In 1920, she was returned to the East Asiatic Company. Kursk was renamed Polonia, the Latin name for Poland.

In 1930, the East Asiatic Company sold its Latvian subsidiary to Polish owners, who renamed the company Polskiego Transatlantyckiego Towarzystwa Okrętowego ("Polish Transatlantic Shipping Company Limited" or PTTO). The ships were operated by Gdynia America Line, which was restructured in 1934 to absorb PTTO.

References

Bibliography

External links

1910 ships
Ocean liners
Passenger ships of Latvia
Passenger ships of Poland
Passenger ships of Russia
Ships built on the River Clyde
Steamships of Latvia
Steamships of Poland
Steamships of Russia
World War I passenger ships of Russia
Ships of the Gdynia-America Line